Hollywood Playhouse, also known as Woodbury Hollywood Playhouse, is a radio anthology drama series that featured adaptations of plays and short stories. Created as a showcase for Tyrone Power, the series began October 3, 1937, on the Blue Network, with Darryl F. Zanuck introducing his 20th Century-Fox star. The half-hour program aired Sundays at 9 p.m. ET until September 1939, when it was moved to the NBC Red Network Wednesdays at 8 pm ET. Woodbury Soap and Jergens Lotion sponsored the show.

Charles Boyer starred in the second season. He left in 1939 to make a film in France, and briefly joined the French army when World War II broke out in Europe. Herbert Marshall succeeded Boyer on Hollywood Playhouse for nine weeks, and he was replaced by Gale Page and Jim Ameche until Boyer returned on the January 3, 1940, broadcast. Page and Ameche headed a summer version of the program titled Promoting Priscilla (July–October 1940).

Weekly guest stars included Joan Blondell and Margaret Sullavan. Harry Sosnik provided the music. The series continued until December 25, 1940.

Preservation status
Only one broadcast of Hollywood Playhouse – "The Sub-Lieutenant" (May 29, 1940), starring Charles Boyer and Margaret Lindsay – is known to survive in radio collections.

See also
Academy Award Theater
Author's Playhouse
The Campbell Playhouse
Cavalcade of America
CBS Radio Workshop
The Dreft Star Playhouse
Ford Theatre
General Electric Theater
Lux Radio Theater
The Mercury Theatre on the Air
Screen Director's Playhouse
Suspense
Theater Guild on the Air

References
 

1930s American radio programs
1940s American radio programs
American radio dramas
Anthology radio series
NBC radio programs
NBC Blue Network radio programs
1937 radio programme debuts
1940 radio programme endings